Eranos (previously known as Otman Eren) is a settlement in the community of Kimmeria, Xanthi regional unit, Greece. It is located northeast of Kimmeria and 15 kilometers northeast of Xanthi.

External links
Greek Travel Pages - Eranos

Populated places in Xanthi (regional unit)